Wheeling Corrugating Company Building, also known as Cook Composites and Polymers (CCP), is a historic factory building located at North Kansas City, Missouri.  It was built in 1920, and is a five-story, six bay, rectangular reinforced concrete building faced in brick with cut stone trim.  A one-story, concrete block addition was built about 1950. It produced corrugated galvanised iron for roofing.

It was listed on the National Register of Historic Places in 1994.

References

Industrial buildings and structures on the National Register of Historic Places in Missouri
Industrial buildings completed in 1920
Buildings and structures in Clay County, Missouri
National Register of Historic Places in Kansas City, Missouri
Building materials companies of the United States
1920 establishments in Missouri